Arrow poisons are used to poison arrow heads or darts for the purposes of hunting and warfare. They have been used by indigenous peoples worldwide and are still in use in areas of South America, Africa and Asia. Notable examples are the poisons secreted from the skin of the poison dart frog, and curare (or 'ampi'), a general term for a range of plant-derived arrow poisons used by the indigenous peoples of South America.

Poisoned arrows have featured in mythology, notably the Greek story of Heracles slaying the centaur Nessus using arrows poisoned with the blood of the Lernaean Hydra. The Greek hero Odysseus poisons his arrows with hellebore in Homer's Odyssey. Poisoned arrows also figure in Homer's epic about the Trojan War, the Iliad, in which both Achaeans and Trojans used toxic arrows and spears. Poisoned arrows are referred to in the Book of Job in the Bible, descriptive of the sufferings experienced by the just man, Job.

The modern terms "toxic" and "toxin" derive from the ancient Greek word for "bow", from Old Persian *taxa-, "an arrow".

Poisoned arrows were used by real people in the ancient world, including the Gauls, ancient Romans, and the nomadic Scythians and Soanes. Ancient Greek and Roman historians describe recipes for poisoning projectiles and historical battles in which poison arrows were used. Alexander the Great encountered poisoned projectiles during his conquest of India (probably dipped in the venom of Russell's viper) and the army of the Roman general Lucullus suffered grievous poison wounds from arrows shot by nomads during the Third Mithridatic War (1st century BC).

In the Kingdom of Kush, arrows were often poison-tipped. There is some indication that poisoned arrows were used in battle against the Romans from 27 BC to 22 BC.

The use of poisoned arrows in hunting and warfare by some Native Americans has also been documented.

Over the ages, Chinese warfare has included projectiles poisoned with various toxic substances.

Varieties

Arrow poisons around the world are created from many sources:

Plant-based poisons

Curare is a generic term for arrow poisons that contain tubocurarine, curarine, quinine, protocurarine and related alkaloids.  Most frequently it is derived from the bark of Strychnos toxifera, S. guianensis (family Loganiaceae), Chondrodendron tomentosum or Sciadotenia toxifera (family Menispermaceae). Curare is a competitive antagonist that blocks nicotinic acetylcholine receptors on the post synaptic membrane of the neuromuscular junction. It is a muscle relaxant that causes death by paralyzing the respiratory system, resulting in asphyxiation.
In Africa, many arrow poisons are made from plants that contain cardiac glycosides, such as Acokanthera (possessing ouabain), oleander (Nerium oleander), milkweeds (Asclepias), or Strophanthus, all of which are in the family Apocynaceae.  Inee or onaye is a poison made from Strophanthus hispidus, which contains the cardiac glycoside strophanthin.  It is used in sub-Saharan West Africa, particularly in the areas of Togo and Cameroon. Certain species of the genus Mostuea (family Gelsemiaceae) are used as additives to arrow poisons (other ingredients unspecified). The toxic principles of Mostuea are alkaloids, not cardiac glycosides.
Poisoned arrows are used widely in the jungle areas of Assam, Burma and Malaysia. The main plant sources for the poisons are members of the genera Antiaris, Strychnos and Strophanthus. Antiaris toxicaria for example, a tree of the mulberry and breadfruit family, is commonly used on Java and its neighbouring islands. The sap or juice of the seeds is smeared on the arrowhead on its own or mixed with other plant extracts.  The fast-acting active ingredient (either antiarin, strychnine or strophanthin) attacks the central nervous system causing paralysis, convulsions and cardiac arrest.
Several species of Aconitum or "aconite," belonging to the buttercup family, have been used as arrow poisons. The Brokpa in Ladakh use A. napellus on their arrows to hunt Siberian ibex; they were in use recently near lake Issyk Kul in Kyrgyzstan.  The Ainus in Japan used a species of Aconitum to hunt brown bear.  It was also used by the Butias and Lepchas in Sikkim and Assam. The Chinese used Aconitum poisons both for hunting and warfare.
The Caribs of the Caribbean used poisons made from the sap of the manchineel tree (Hippomane mancinella) or sandbox tree (Hura crepitans), both members of the spurge family, Euphorbiaceae.

Animal-based poisons

In South America, tribes such as the Noanamá Chocó and Emberá Chocó of western Colombia dip the tips of their blowgun darts in the poison found on the skin of three species of Phyllobates, a genus of poison dart frog. In northern Chocó Department, Phyllobates aurotaenia is used, while P. bicolor is used in Risaralda Department and southern Chocó. In Cauca Department, only P. terribilis is used for dart making. The poison is generally collected by roasting the frogs over a fire, but the batrachotoxins in P. terribilis are powerful enough that it is sufficient to dip the dart in the back of the frog without killing it.
In the northern Kalahari Desert, the most commonly used arrow poison is derived from the larva and pupae of beetles of the genus Diamphidia. It is applied to the arrow either by squeezing the contents of the larva directly onto the arrow head, mixing it with plant sap to act as an adhesive, or by mixing a powder made from the dried larva with plant juices and applying that to the arrow tip. The toxin is slow attacking and large animals, including humans, can survive 4–5 days before succumbing to the effects.
In the United States, Native American tribes used venomous reptiles to provide the poisons required. In the Southwest United States, the Gila monster, being one of the only two venomous lizards, has been used as a source.
 There is evidence of Pacific Island cultures using poison arrow and spear tips. An account from Hector Holthouse's book "Cannibal Cargoes" (on the subject of the Australian Pacific Island Labour Trade) describes a canoe, resting on forks in the sand; within the canoe the body of a man rotting in the sun. The unsealed canoe allowing the putrefaction to collect in a notched shallow bowl in which arrow heads and spear tips are soaked. Wounds with these weapons caused tetanus infection.

Preparation

The following 17th-century account describes how arrow poisons were prepared in China:

See also
 Blowgun
 Bushman poison (disambiguation)
 Fire Arrow
 Fukiya, Japanese blowgun
 Loire style blowgun  (French page)

References

Archery
Arrow types
Hunting equipment
Projectiles
Poisons